Hardin Township is a township in Greene County, Iowa, USA.

History
Hardin Township was established in 1869. Hardin is the name of an early settler.

References

Townships in Greene County, Iowa
Townships in Iowa
1869 establishments in Iowa
Populated places established in 1869